The Trinidad and Tobago International in badminton is an international open held in Trinidad & Tobago.

Previous winners

References

External links 
 Trinidad and Tobago Badminton Association

Badminton tournaments
Badminton tournaments in Trinidad and Tobago
Sports competitions in Trinidad and Tobago